The 2007 Atlantic 10 men's basketball tournament was played from March 7 to March 10, 2007, at Boardwalk Hall in Atlantic City, New Jersey.  The winner was named champion of the Atlantic 10 Conference and received an automatic bid to the 2007 NCAA Men's Division I Basketball Tournament.  George Washington University won the tournament. Maureece Rice, a guard on George Washington, was named Most Outstanding Player of the tournament. The top four teams in the conference received first-round byes, while La Salle University and St. Bonaventure University were left out of the tournament because they did not finish in the top twelve of the conference.

Bracket

All games played at Boardwalk Hall, Atlantic City, NJ

n:2007 A-10 Tournament

Atlantic 10 men's basketball tournament
Tournament
Atlantic 10 men's basketball tournament
Atlantic 10 men's basketball tournament
Basketball in New Jersey